Zalmai Rassoul (born 11 May 1943) is an Afghan politician who served as Foreign Minister of Afghanistan from January 2010 to October 2013. He previously served as National Security Advisor from June 2002 to January 2010. Through his various roles in Government, Rassoul played a key role in building the Afghan security architecture, uniting the international community in support of an Afghan-led and Afghan-owned peace process, strengthening regional cooperation and security through the establishment of the Regional Economic Cooperation Conference on Afghanistan and the Heart of Asia-Istanbul Process, and rebuilding vital industries. He stood as a candidate in the 2014 presidential election.

Early life
Rassoul was born on 11 of May 1943 in Kabul, Afghanistan, to Abdu'l Qayyum Khan Sarkar and his wife Farukh Begum, daughter of Emir Habibullah Khan. He is the nephew of Amānullāh Khān, the King of Afghanistan from 1909–1929. He attendedLycée Esteqlal where he graduated as the valedictorian. Subsequently, he traveled to France to study on a scholarship at the Paris Medical School and received his M.D. in 1973.

He is an ethnic Pashtun, belonging to Barakzai (Mohammadzai) tribe (of the Zirak branch of the Durrani Confederacy). He is fluent in Dari Persian, French, English, and Italian and has a working knowledge of Arabic.

He has over 30 publications in European and American medical journals and is a member of the American Society of Nephrology.

Career
Rassoul has a vast experience in diplomacy, international affairs, governance and political activities. He has been deeply active for several decades in the political struggle for the rights of the Afghan people to live in peace and decide their future in accordance with their free will through democratic processes.

In 1998, Rassoul worked as the Director of the Secretariat of His Majesty Mohammad Zaher Shah – the former King of Afghanistan. In this role, he devoted his full attention to the convening of an Emergency Loya Jirga (Grand Assembly) – an initiative by the former King which aimed at achieving a political settlement to the decades-long war in the country.

Under Rassoul's leadership, the Secretariat in Rome played a key role in the future political transition of Afghanistan. Prior to the Bonn Conference, Zahir Shah dispatched numerous delegations to world capitals, Afghanistan's neighbors, and Afghanistan itself to build support for the convening of the Emergency Loya Jirga.

Rassoul accompanied President Hamid Karzai, at that time a leading member of the Executive Committee of the Loya Jirga, on these missions. Rassoul was suited for this work because of his long term, close contact with Afghan resistance and his 1980 founding and publishing of the monthly publication Afghan Reality created to increase awareness and be a voice of information from inside Afghanistan to the international community regarding the plight of the Afghan people.

Rassoul later served as a delegate to the historic December 2001 Bonn Conference. Following the Bonn Conference, he returned to Kabul to take part at the inauguration of the Afghan Interim Administration.

Rassoul was nominated by President Hamid Karzai as Minister of Civil Aviation and unanimously approved by the Cabinet in March 2002. Under his leadership, Afghanistan's aviation sector was revived after many years of United Nations sanctions against the Taliban and Afghanistan. Rassoul played an important role in Afghanistan's readmission to the International Air Transport Association (IATA) and the International Civil Aviation Organization (ICAO).

2014 presidential election
On 5 October 2013 Rassoul resigned from his position as Foreign Minister and on 6 October he officially filed his nomination to stand as a candidate in the 2014 presidential election. His running mate is Ahmad Zia Massoud.

See also
Cabinet of Ministers
Ministry of Foreign Affairs (Afghanistan)
Politics of Afghanistan

References

External links

1943 births
Living people
Pashtun people
Foreign ministers of Afghanistan
People from Kabul